Jorge Springmühl (born 6 October 1957) is a Guatemalan sailor. He competed in the 470 event at the 1976 Summer Olympics.

References

External links
 

1957 births
Living people
Guatemalan male sailors (sport)
Olympic sailors of Guatemala
Sailors at the 1976 Summer Olympics – 470
Place of birth missing (living people)